Live and Rare is a Faster Pussycat EP. All tracks on the album appeared on the band's first 2 albums, but are featured here in alternate remixed, edited, or live versions.

Track list
 "Bathroom Wall" (Remix)
 "Poison Ivy" (Edit)
 "Pulling Weeds" (Live)
 "Slip of the Tongue" (Live)
 "Babylon" (Live)
 "House of Pain" (Edit)

Personnel
 Taime Downe – lead vocals
 Greg Steele – guitar
 Brent Muscat – guitar
 Eric Stacy – bass guitar
 Mark Michals – drums

Faster Pussycat albums
1990 EPs
Live EPs
1990 live albums